In Scottish folklore,  is a loch monster said to live in Loch Maree, and its neighbouring lochs. The term loosely translates as "turtle-pig."

In the 1850s, a Mr Banks from Letterewe tried at great expense to drain Loch-na-Bèiste, near Aultbea, but failed. He also tried to poison it with quicklime.  is Scottish Gaelic for "loch of the beast", beast often being used for a loch monster, especially in Ireland.

See also
 Lake monster
 Morag (loch monster)

References
 
 AA Touring Guide to Scotland (1978)

Scottish folklore
Scottish legendary creatures
Water monsters